The Vègre is an  long river in the Sarthe department in western France. Its source is near Rouessé-Vassé. It flows generally south. It is a right tributary of the Sarthe, into which it flows near Avoise.

Communes along its course
This list is ordered from source to mouth: Rouessé-Vassé, Rouez-en-Champagne, Tennie, Neuvy-en-Champagne, Bernay-en-Champagne, Ruillé-en-Champagne, Épineu-le-Chevreuil, Chassillé, Loué, Mareil-en-Champagne, Brûlon, Saint-Ouen-en-Champagne, Chevillé, Avessé, Poillé-sur-Vègre, Fontenay-sur-Vègre, Asnières-sur-Vègre, Juigné-sur-Sarthe, Avoise.

References

Rivers of France
Rivers of Sarthe
Rivers of Pays de la Loire